Afzal Husain was born in 1975 and received B.E. and MTech degrees in mechanical engineering with specialization in Thermal Sciences from Aligarh Muslim University, Aligarh, India in 2003 and 2005, respectively. He received the PhD degree in Thermodynamics and Fluid Mechanics from Inha University, Incheon, South Korea, in 2010. He was a lecturer of Mechanical Engineering at Inha University from Mar. 2010 to Aug. 2012. Since Oct. 2012, he is Assistant Professor with Mechanical and Industrial Engineering Department. He has published more than 30 articles in peer-reviewed international journals and conferences proceedings apart from a number of papers in domestic journals/conferences and workshops. His research interests are computational fluid engineering (CFE), heat transfer, optimization techniques, optimization of fluid and heat transfer systems using CFD and surrogate models, genetic algorithms, development of heat transfer augmentation techniques for conventional- and micro-systems, fluid flow and thermal analysis of microelectromechanical systems (MEMS), and electronic cooling. Dr. Husain received Best Researcher Award at Inha University in 2009 and his profile is included in Marquis Who's Who 2011 as engineering educator

References

1975 births
Living people
Mechanical engineers
Aligarh Muslim University alumni